Premier Girls Fastpitch (PGF) is a national travel softball association.  Teams compete in local, state, regional, and national tournaments. The national tournament is held every year in Huntington Beach, California, and consists of Premier and Platinum divisions.

History 
Premier Girls Fastpitch was founded in 2009 by Gary Haning and Dan Hay in Huntington Beach, California.  The premise of the organization was to compete with the Amateur Softball Association by having teams qualify for regional events as well as the National Championships, ultimately creating better competition for larger events.

Divisions 
At the national level, Premier Girls Fastpitch has two primary divisions: Premier and Platinum.  The Premier Division is for top-level competition.  Teams that enter the Premier division can expect to play against the best teams in the tournament.  The Platinum Division is considered a stepping stone into the Premier Division.  Teams wishing to improve that are not yet ready for Premier tend to enter the Platinum division. A third division, Regional, exists for teams that do not wish to play at the national level.  The Regional division does not have sub-divisions, and instead, all teams are pooled together.

PGF Premier National Championship Winners (2013-2021)

References

Women's softball
Softball organizations
Softball in the United States
Women's sports organizations in the United States
Sports organizations established in 2009